The Toshiba T3100 is a discontinued portable PC manufactured by Toshiba released in 1986. It features a  hard drive, 8 MHz Intel 80286 CPU and a black & orange 9.6" gas-plasma display with a resolution of 640x400 pixels.

The portable has a special high-resolution 640 x 400 display mode which is similar to and partially compatible with the Olivetti/AT&T 6300 graphics. The base model has 640 KB memory. There is a single proprietary expansion slot for 1200 bit/s modem, expansion chassis for 5x 8-bit ISA cards, Ethernet NIC, 2400 bit/s modem, and a 2 MB memory card (thus 2.6 MB in max total).  T3100e model has 1 MB of memory, which can be upgraded to 5 MB.

Toshiba T3100 is not a true portable, because it needs an external power source in all except the last version.

Five versions exist:
The T3100/20 is essentially the same as the base T3100 but with a larger hard drive (20 MB instead of 10 MB).
The T3100e has a 12 MHz 80286 CPU (switchable to 6 MHz, 1 MB RAM and a 20 MB hard drive.
The T3100e/40 is the same as the T3100e, but with a larger 40 MB hard drive.
The T3100SX has a 16 MHz i386SX CPU, 1 MB RAM and a 40 MB or 80 MB hard drive, a VGA 640x480x16 shade black & orange gas plasma display or black & white LCD, and also included an internal rechargeable battery, for true portability.
The J3100 is a version of the T3100 that was marketed and sold in Japan only.

Reception
BYTE in 1989 listed the T3100/20 as among the "Distinction" winners of the BYTE Awards, citing its "amazingly clear" display and hard drive.

See also 
 Toshiba T1200
 Toshiba T1100
 Toshiba T1000

References

External links 
 Computer Museum article on the Toshiba T3100
 Toshiba Science Museum on laptops
 Toshiba brochure

IBM PC compatibles
T3100
Computer-related introductions in 1986